Carl Sentance (born 28 June 1961 in Loughborough) is an English rock singer and current vocalist for Nazareth.

He began his career as the singer for Persian Risk. In 1986, as Persian Risk disbanded, he was recruited by Black Sabbath bassist Geezer Butler to front the Geezer Butler Band. In 1990, he was sought out by Welsh guitarist Paul Chapman of Lone Star, UFO, and Waysted fame to front a new band, Ghost, in Orlando, Florida. Sentance also assembled an American version of Persian Risk with guitarist Mark Lanoue; the band gigged in the Southern US area until their demise in 1995. Back in the UK, the singer was involved in a project with members of Wraith before being asked to front legendary Swiss hard rockers Krokus in 1998; he appeared on their Round 13 album and stayed on for the next three years. In 2005, Sentance emerged fronting Whole Lotta Metal alongside co-vocalist Tony Martin of Black Sabbath fame and other British metal session musicians, assembled for a touring cast of cover versions. The singer also served as the voice for the Power Project who issued the Dinosaurs album in 2006. It featured Sentance and veteran US musicians Carlos Cavazo (Quiet Riot, Ratt), Jeff Pilson (Dokken, Dio, Foreigner), and Vinny Appice (Black Sabbath, Dio). On the live front, the singer teamed up with Deep Purple's Don Airey & Friends and can also be heard on Airey's 2008 solo effort, A Light in the Sky, and also on Airey´s 2008 album, One of a Kind, where he is the lead vocalist on all songs. Sentance issued his debut solo album, Mind Doctor, in 2008; musical guests include Airey on keyboards and the Thunder rhythm section of Harry James and Chris Childs.

Sentance became the lead vocalist for Nazareth in February 2015.

Discography
Solo
2009: Mind Doctor (self released)

2Bad
2016: Aiming High (self released)

Don Airey
2008: A Light In the Sky (Album, Mascot Records)
2011: All Out (Album, Mascot Records)
2014: Keyed Up (Album, Mascot Records)
2018: One of a Kind (Album, Ear Music)
2021:  Live In Hamburg

Dario Mollo’s Crossbones
 2016: Rock the Cradle (Album, Frontiers Music)

Intelligent Music
 2015: Intelligent Music Project III – Touching the Divine (Album, Intelligent Music)

Krokus
 1999: Round 13 (Album, Angel Air)

Nazareth
 2018: Tattooed on My Brain (Album, Frontiers Music)
 2022: Surviving the Law (Album, Frontiers Music)

Persian Risk
 1981: Calling for You (single, SRT)
 1983: Ridin’ High (single, Neat Records)
 1984: Too Different (maxi-single, Zebra Records)
 1986: Rise Up (Album, Metal Masters)
 2012: Once a King (self released)
 2014: Who Am I (Album, Carlos Records)

Power Project
 2006: Dinosaurs (Album, Powerzone Records)

Tredegar
 1986: Tredegar (Album, Aries)

References

1961 births
Living people
People from Loughborough
English rock singers
English heavy metal singers
English male singers
Nazareth (band) members